Henry Alfred Gooden (12 January 1858 – 30 March 1904) was an Australian cricketer. He played in three first-class matches for South Australia between 1877 and 1881.

Playing for Norwood Cricket Club in Adelaide.

Outside of cricket, Gooden worked for the South Australian Audit Department before transferring to Melbourne in 1902 to work for the new Federal Audit Office. He was also heavily involved in religious work, spending 27 years volunteering with the Baptist Church in Adelaide, including serving as the Adelaide Secretary of the Poona and Indian Village Mission. 

Gooden died in Melbourne on 30 March 1904, leaving "a widow and a large family".

Gooden's brother James Gooden and nephew Leslie Gooden also played cricket for South Australia, while another brother, George Gooden, was the first curator of the Adelaide Oval and Town Clerk of Kensington and Norwood.

See also
 List of South Australian representative cricketers

References

Sources
 Page, R. (1984) South Australian Cricketers 1877–1984, Association of Cricket Statisticians and Historians: Retford, Nottinghamshire.

External links
 

1858 births
1904 deaths
Australian cricketers
South Australia cricketers
Cricketers from Adelaide